General Yakubu Gowon assumed power on 1 August 1966 in a coup that deposed General Johnson Aguiyi-Ironsi.
In May 1967 he reorganized the four regions in twelve states, appointing a military governor for each state.
Gowon was deposed in a coup on 29 July 1975, replaced by General Murtala Muhammed.

Nigerian military governors
1960s in Nigeria
1970s in Nigeria

Here Are Some Names Of Military Governors Created By The Gowon Proclamation Of A New 12 States To Replace The Four Regions: